The Herricks Union Free School District (also known as Union Free School District No. 9) is an American public school district located in western Nassau County on Long Island, in New York.

The district lies within the Greater New Hyde Park area and serves a number of communities, including Herricks, Garden City Park, Manhasset Hills, Searingtown, North Hills, Williston Park and Albertson.

History

The school in Herricks was established in 1813, making it one of the oldest in Nassau County. It was named for Herricks Path, a path that existed as early as 1659. By 1898, the Herricks School was one of Nassau County's last single-room schools.

The Herricks Community Center is located just south of the High School. It once served as the junior high school before the current one was built.

Herricks High School stands on Watermelon Hill. The land near the area was a burial ground for the Pearsall family starting in the 17th century, but the burial grounds were later removed.

The High School opened in 1958 and had its first graduating class in 1960.

Known as the "Herricks Prayer Case, Engel v. Vitale," in 1959 the Herricks School District a.k.a. Union Free School District #9 was sued by five district property owners. "Almighty God, we acknowledge our dependence upon Thee, and we beg Thy blessings upon us, our parents, our teachers and our Country," was recited as a daily procedure on the recommendation of the NY State Board of Regents.  This case was decided by the U. S. Supreme Court, which ruled the prayer unconstitutional in 1962.

The Herricks Union Free School District celebrated its 200th Anniversary in 2013.

Schools

Current 
As of October 2021, the Herricks UFSD operates the following schools:
Herricks High School
Herricks Middle School
Denton Avenue Elementary School
Center Street Elementary School
Searingtown Elementary School

Former 
The Herricks Community Center (1925 - 1948) was the junior high school building before the current; it currently also serves as the District's administrative offices.

Administration 
As of November 2022, the Superintendent of the Herricks Union Free School District is Dr. Tony Sinanis, the Assistant Superintendent for Instruction is Elizabeth Guercin, the Assistant Superintendent for Business is Lisa Rutkoske, C.P.A., and the Assistant Superintendent for Human Resources is Dina Maggiacomo.

References

External links 
Official website

School districts in New York (state)
Education in Nassau County, New York
1813 establishments in New York (state)